MSC is a football club from Meppel, Netherlands.

History 
MSC played in the 2017–18 Sunday Hoofdklasse A. and in the 2019–20 Hoofdklasse. 

After disbanding its Sunday team, it plays in the Vierde Klasse.

References

External links
 Official site

Football clubs in the Netherlands
Football clubs in Meppel
Association football clubs established in 1910
1910 establishments in the Netherlands